Weymouth Back River Reservation is a protected coastal reservation in Hingham and Weymouth, Massachusetts. It contains parks on the west and east sides of the northern end of Weymouth Back River. On the west side in Weymouth, Abigail Adams Park is adjacent to and north of Route 3A Bridge and Great Esker Park is south of the bridge. On the east side in Hingham, Stodder's Neck is north of the bridge and Bare Cove Park is south of the bridge. It features Weymouth Back River views, walking trails and landscaped areas.

The reservation is part of the Metropolitan Park System of Greater Boston.

References

External links
Stodder's Neck & Abigail Adams Park Department of Conservation and Recreation
Weymouth Back River Reservation Map Department of Conservation and Recreation

Hingham, Massachusetts
State parks of Massachusetts
Weymouth, Massachusetts
Parks in Plymouth County, Massachusetts
Parks in Norfolk County, Massachusetts